Bash & Pop are an American alternative rock band formed in 1992 by Tommy Stinson in Minneapolis, Minnesota, following the breakup of the Replacements. It released one album before disbanding in 1994. Tommy Stinson reformed the band in 2016 with a new lineup and album.

History
With a name selected from a contest hosted by New York radio station WDRE, Bash & Pop was formed in 1992 by bassist Tommy Stinson, following the breakup of his previous group The Replacements. Stinson switched to guitar, with Steve Foley (from The Replacements) on drums, his brother Kevin Foley on bass, and Steve Brantseg on guitar.

The album Friday Night Is Killing Me was recorded by the band with the assistance of  Benmont Tench and Mike Campbell, Wire Train's Jeff Trott as well as other musicians Greg Leisz, Brian McCloud, Phil Jones and Tommy Steel. The album was released in January 1993 through Sire/Reprise Records to mainly mixed reviews with Stewart Mason, of Allmusic, stating that "there are a couple of great songs here, the catchy single "Loose Ends" and the rocking "Fast and Hard", but even those two songs feel sloppily half-written, with choruses that vamp on repeatedly for far too long. Most of the rest of the album sounds fine while it's playing, but the songs aren't at all memorable." Steven Mirkin, of Rolling Stone, described the album as "not as pointed as ex-Mats drummer Chris Mars's vitriolic Horseshoes and Hand Grenades and lacking Westerberg's songwriting polish, Friday Night Is Killing Me is still a notable debut that at its best flashes the easygoing, knockabout charm missing from the Replacements' last few albums." Bruce Haring, of Variety, described the album as "a frisky little rocker propelled by Stinson's endless energy and peppy, raspish vocals." A tour in support followed along with the recording of the track "Making Me Sick" which was included on the soundtrack, released in 1994, to the movie Clerks. The group disbanded later in 1994.

Describing the band's dissolution, Stinson said:

Post-breakup
Stinson went on to form another group, Perfect, before going on to join  Guns N' Roses and releasing his debut solo album Village Gorilla Head while drummer Steve Foley joined Wheelo, previously known as 69, releasing the album Something Wonderful in 1997.

2016 reunion
Tommy Stinson worked on new material in 2015 and 2016, releasing two songs on the L.M.A.O. EP, and later decided to release a record as a band under the name of Bash & Pop, as he felt that it was more of a band record. He launched a PledgeMusic campaign to fund the album. On November 2, 2016, the new album was announced to be called Anything Could Happen, with the release date being set on January 20, 2017. A music video for the song "On The Rocks" was also released.

Discography

Studio albums
 Friday Night Is Killing Me (1993)
 Anything Could Happen (2017)

Singles
 Too Late/Saturday (Featuring Nicole Atkins) (2017)

Compilations
 Clerks: Music from the Motion Picture (1994) The track "Making Me Sick"

Band members
1992-1994
Tommy Stinson – vocals, rhythm guitar
Steve Brantseg – lead guitar
Kevin Foley – bass
Steve Foley – drums, percussion

2016–present 
Tommy Stinson – vocals, rhythm guitar
Steve Selvidge – lead guitar
Justin Perkins – bass
Joe Sirois – drums, percussion

References

External links

Musical groups established in 1992
Musical groups disestablished in 1994
Musical groups reestablished in 2016
Alternative rock groups from Minnesota
Musical groups from Minnesota
Sire Records artists